Deepika Kumari (born 13 June 1994) is an Indian professional archer. Currently ranked the World No. 2, she competes in the event of archery. She won a gold medal in the 2010 Commonwealth games in the women's individual recurve event. She also won a gold medal in the same competition in the women's team recurve event along with Dola Banerjee and Bombayala Devi. She has won individual gold in two of the three stages of the World Cup--one in Guatemala and another in Paris. In the process she also reclaimed the number one ranking after nine years  in  Paris World Cup. Deepika Kumari won individual gold medals at the  Archery World Cup Stage 1. Deepika Kumari also defeated Mexico by 5–1 in the final to win gold in Paris.

Kumari qualified for the 2012 Summer Olympics in London, where she competed in the Women's Individual and Women's team events, finishing in eighth place in the latter.

She was conferred the Arjuna Award, India's second highest sporting award, in the year 2012 by President of India Pranab Mukherjee. In February 2014, she was honored with FICCI Sportsperson of the Year Award. The Government of India awarded her the civilian honour of the Padma Shri in 2016.

Early life 
Deepika Kumari was born in Ranchi, Bihar (now Jharkhand) to Shivnarayan Mahato, an auto-rickshaw driver, and Geeta, a nurse at Ranchi Medical College, and a native of Ratu Chatti village, 15 km away from Ranchi, Jharkhand. She belongs to Prajapati family.

As a child, she practised archery while aiming for mangoes with stones. In the early days it was difficult for the parents to financially support Deepika's dream, often compromising on the family budget to buy her new equipment for her training; as a result, Deepika practised archery using homemade bamboo bows and arrows. Deepika's cousin Vidya Kumari, then an archer residing at Tata Archery Academy, helped her develop her talent.

Career 

Deepika made her first breakthrough in 2005 when she entered the Arjun Archery Academy at Kharsawan, an institute set up by Meera Munda, wife of Jharkhand's chief minister Arjun Munda. But her professional archery journey began in the year 2006 when she joined the Tata Archery Academy in Jamshedpur. It was here that she started her training with both the proper equipment as well as a uniform. She also received Rs 500 as a stipend. Deepika returned home once in her first three years there, only after having won the Cadet World Championship title in November 2009. Kumari has long been seen as the one to finally get India its first medal in archery.

Personal life
Deepika married archer Atanu Das on 30 June 2020.

Achievements 
Deepika became the second Indian to win the title after Palton Hansda won the junior compound competition at the 2006 Archery World Cup in Mérida, Mexico.

She won the 11th Youth World Archery Championship held in Ogden, Utah, United States in 2009, at the age of fifteen. She also won a gold medal in the same competition in the women's team recurve event, alongside Dola Banerjee and Bombayala Devi.

At the Delhi Commonwealth games 2010, Deepika won two gold medals, one in the individual event and the other in the women's team recurve event. For this, she was honoured with the Outstanding Performance at CWG (Female) Award at the 2010 Sahara Sports Awards ceremony.

Later at the Asian Games of 2010, held in Guangzhou, China, Deepika missed out on a medal after she lost to Kwon Un Sil of North Korea in the bronze-medal play-off of the women's individual archery event. But as a part of the Indian archery recurve team, along with Rimil Buriuly and Dola Banerjee, Deepika edged out Chinese Taipei 218–217 in the bronze play-off to ensure a podium finish at the Aoti Archery Range.

In May 2012, Deepika Kumari won her first World Cup individual stage recurve gold medal at Antalya, Turkey. She beat Korea's Lee Sung-Jin by six set points to four in the final. Later in 2012, she would go on to become world no. 1 in Women's Recurve Archery.
In London Olympics 2012, Deepika Kumari lost against Amy Oliver of Great Britain in the opening round, attributing a relatively poor performance to fever and high winds.

On 22 July 2013, she won the gold medal in Archery World Cup stage 3 held at Medellin, Colombia where India finished fourth. On 22 September 2013, Deepika lost 4–6 to Yun Ok-Hee of South Korea & settled for silver medal in 2013 FITA Archery World Cup. This was her 3rd Silver medal in as many appearances in the World Cup Final.

In 2014, Deepika was featured by Forbes (India) as one of their '30 under 30'. However, she failed to make the Indian team for 2014 after finishing outside the top 4 at the national qualifications.

In 2015, Deepika's first medal came at the second stage of the World Cup, where she won a bronze in the individual event. At the World Championships in Copenhagen, she won a team silver along with Laxmirani Majhi and Rimil Buriuly, after narrowly losing out on a gold in a match against Russia which they conceded 4–5 in a shoot-off. In the latter half of this year, she won the silver medal in the World Cup final. In November 2015, she won a bronze medal in the Asian Championships with Jayanta Talukdar in the Recurve Mixed Team event.

In April 2016, at the first stage of the World Cup in Shanghai, Deepika equaled the Ki Bo-bae's world record of (686/720) in the women's recurve event.

Deepika Kumari was the part of the team that qualified for 2016 Rio Olympics. The Indian women's recursive team, consisting of Deepika Kumari, Bombayla Devi Laishram and Laxmirani Majhi, finished 7th in the ranking round. The team won their match against Colombia in the round of 16 before losing the quarterfinal match against Russia.

In the women's Individual archery, Deepika Kumari produced a stellar performance in the round of 64 against Kristine Esebua of Georgia. Deepika won this round with a score of 6–4. In the next round, Deepika had a much-easier outing against Guendalina Sartori of Italy. Deepika started badly and lost the first round but won the next three to ease through 6–2 in the end. However, in the round of 16, Deepika went down to Taipei's Tan Ya-ting with a score of 0 against 6.

In November 2019, Deepika Kumari secured an Olympic quota at the Continental Qualification Tournament being held on the sidelines of the 21st Asian Archery Championships in Bangkok. Deepika Kumari India won 3 gold medals in the Archery's World Cup Stage 3 tournament in Paris 2021. She thus recorded the 13th triple gold and became the 11th archer to achieve the feat – in the 15-year history of the Hyundai Archery World Cup.

In popular culture 

A biographical documentary called Ladies First, released in 2017, was made by Uraaz Bahl and his wife Shaana Levy-Bahl. The movie won at the London Independent Film Festival and was screened at the Mallorca Film Festival in October 2017. Ladies First has also been submitted for the Short Documentary category at Oscars.

This documentary was also screened with Maneka Gandhi, the Union Cabinet Minister for Women and Child Development, with an aim to increase the national awareness about women in sports in India.

Awards

Individual performance timeline

References

External links

 
 
 
 

1994 births
Living people
People from Ranchi
People from Ranchi district
Sportswomen from Jharkhand
Athletes from Jharkhand
21st-century Indian women
21st-century Indian people
Indian female archers
Archers at the 2012 Summer Olympics
Archers at the 2016 Summer Olympics
Archers at the 2020 Summer Olympics
Olympic archers of India
Archers at the 2010 Asian Games
Archers at the 2014 Asian Games
Archers at the 2018 Asian Games
Asian Games bronze medalists for India
Asian Games medalists in archery
Medalists at the 2010 Asian Games
Archers at the 2010 Commonwealth Games
Commonwealth Games gold medallists for India
Commonwealth Games medallists in archery
World Archery Championships medalists
Recipients of the Arjuna Award
Recipients of the Padma Shri in sports
Nagpuria people
Medallists at the 2010 Commonwealth Games